Cole is a Canadian drama film, directed by Carl Bessai and released in 2009.

The film stars Richard de Klerk as Cole Chambers, a young man from Lytton who longs to escape his smalltown existence with his dysfunctional family. He is accepted into a university creative writing program in Vancouver, where he begins a romance with Serafina (Kandyse McClure), but faces a difficult choice when his friends and family back home struggle to survive without his presence. The cast also includes Rebecca Jenkins as Cole's mentally ill mother, Sonja Bennett as his sister Maybelline, and Chad Willett as Maybelline's abusive husband Bobby.

The film premiered at the 2009 Toronto International Film Festival, and screened at a number of other film festivals before going into commercial release in 2010.

Chad Willett won the Leo Awards for Best Supporting Performance by a Male in a Feature Length Drama in 2010

Bennett received a Genie Award nomination for Best Supporting Actress at the 31st Genie Awards.

References

External links

2009 films
English-language Canadian films
Canadian drama films
Films shot in British Columbia
Films set in British Columbia
Films directed by Carl Bessai
Films scored by Clinton Shorter
2009 drama films
2000s English-language films
2000s Canadian films